Cernay is a commune in the Haut-Rhin department in Grand Est in north-eastern France.

It is situated on the river Thur, 17 km northwest of Mulhouse.

Second World War
The SS had an "ideology school" for their soldiers, where "race theory" was part of the curriculum.

Population

See also
 Communes of the Haut-Rhin department

References

External links

Images of Cernay

Communes of Haut-Rhin
Haut-Rhin communes articles needing translation from French Wikipedia